"A Love Like Yours (Don't Come Knocking Everyday)" is a 1963 song issued as the B-side to Motown singing group Martha and the Vandellas' hit single, "Heat Wave", released on the Gordy label.

The song, written and produced by Vandellas cohorts, Holland–Dozier–Holland, is a song where a woman praises her lover for loving her after she "broke (his) heart and made (him) blue" saying afterwards "instead of hurting back" telling her he loved her.

The song, while not released as a single, is regarded as a sixties classic with notable covers by Ike & Tina Turner, Dusty Springfield, Harry Nilsson and Cher, Juice Newton, Manfred Mann, and the Animals. Ike & Tina's version was the only version that became a charted hit peaking at No. 16 on the UK Singles charts.

Credits
Lead vocals and spoken monologues by Martha Reeves
Background vocals by Rosalind Ashford, Annette Beard, and Brian Holland
Produced by Brian Holland and Lamont Dozier
Written by Brian Holland, Lamont Dozier and Edward Holland, Jr.
Instrumentation by The Funk Brothers

Ike & Tina Turner version 
Ike & Tina Turner released their version as a single from their 1966 album River Deep – Mountain High. The single was released on London Records in the UK in 1966. In 1967, a few copies were issued in the US by Phil Spector's label Philles Records. This was the label's final release of any single. The album River Deep – Mountain High was not released in the US until it was reissued by A&M Records in 1969. Following the album's reissue, "A Love Like Yours (Don't Come Knocking Everyday)" was reissued as single in the US in 1970.

Track listing

Chart performance

References 

1963 songs
1966 singles
Songs written by Holland–Dozier–Holland
Martha and the Vandellas songs
Dusty Springfield songs
Harry Nilsson songs
Juice Newton songs
Manfred Mann songs
The Animals songs
Ike & Tina Turner songs
1970 singles
Philles Records singles
A&M Records singles
1967 singles
Song recordings produced by Phil Spector
Song recordings produced by Lamont Dozier
Song recordings produced by Brian Holland
London Records singles
1975 singles